The United States House of Representatives elections of 2004 in Arkansas occurred on November 2, 2004 to elect the members of the State of Arkansas's delegation to the United States House of Representatives. Arkansas had four seats in the House, apportioned according to the 2000 United States Census.

These elections were held concurrently with the United States presidential election of 2004, United States Senate elections of 2004 (including one in Arkansas), the United States House elections in other states, and various state and local elections.

Overview

(*Given Representative Mike Ross ran unopposed (earning 100% by default) the Secretary of State of Arkansas's election division recorded no voting data for the Fourth Congressional District election. Thus vote totals for Democratic candidates and all candidates do not account Ross's votes earned)

Results

References

United States House of Representatives
Arkansas
2004